Lu Yi (Chinese: 鲁毅; born 20 March 1993 in Zibo, Shandong) is a Chinese footballer who currently plays for Hefei City.

Club career
Lu Yi started his professional football career in 2012 when he was promoted to Chinese Super League club Qingdao Jonoon. On 3 November 2012, Lu made his debut for Qingdao Jonoon in the 2012 Chinese Super League against Shanghai Shenhua, coming on as a substitute for Song Bo in the 67th minute.  In July 2014, Lu was loaned to China League Two side Shandong Tengding. He was sent to the Qingdao Jonoon reserved team in 2015.

On 2 February 2016, Lu was loaned to League Two club Baotou Nanjiao until 30 November 2016. He would return to Qingdao for two seasons before being sent to the reserves again in 2019. On 21 August 2020 he would leave Qingdao to join another third tier football club Qingdao Red Lions.

Career statistics 
Statistics accurate as of match played 31 December 2020.

References

External links

1993 births
Living people
Chinese footballers
Footballers from Shandong
Qingdao Hainiu F.C. (1990) players
Chinese Super League players
China League One players
Association football forwards